Heather D. Willauer (born 1974) is an American analytical chemist and inventor working in Washington, D.C., at the United States Naval Research Laboratory (NRL). Leading a research team, Willauer has patented a method for removing dissolved carbon dioxide (CO2) from seawater, in parallel with hydrogen (H2) recovered by conventional water electrolysis. Willauer is also searching to improve the catalysts required to enable a continuous Fischer–Tropsch process to recombine carbon monoxide (CO) and hydrogen gases into complex hydrocarbon liquids to synthesize jet fuel for Navy aircraft.

Especially significant for the Navy is the possibility of maintaining naval air operations in remote areas without depending too much on long-distance transport of jet fuel across oceans. The Navy is also studying the feasibility of constructing on-shore facilities capable of synthesizing kerosene from hydrogen and CO2, both extracted from seawater constituents. Because of the very high electrical power required by water electrolysis to produce considerable amounts of hydrogen, nuclear power plants or ocean thermal energy conversion (OTEC) are necessary to fuel the industrial installations built on-shore on remote islands close to the sea in strategic locations.

Education
Willauer attended Berry College in Georgia, graduating with a bachelor's degree in chemistry in 1996. In mid-1999 she participated in the 11th International Conference on Partitioning in Aqueous Two-Phase Systems, held in Gulf Shores, Alabama. In 2002, she earned a doctorate in analytical chemistry from the University of Alabama, writing her thesis on "Fundamentals of phase behavior and solute partitioning in ABS and applications to the paper industry," the "ABS" an abbreviation for "aqueous biphasic systems". She began working with the NRL as an associate, then in 2004 she advanced to the position of research chemist.

Career
Willauer started researching biphasic systems and phase transitions after graduating from Berry College. In 1998 she studied aqueous biphasic systems (ABS) for the potential of recapturing valuable dyes from textile manufacturing effluent. She investigated ions and catalysts.

In the 2000s, Willauer began studying methods for extracting CO2 and H2 from seawater, for the purpose of reacting these molecules into hydrocarbons by using the Fischer–Tropsch process. She also investigated modified iron (Fe) catalysts and studied zeolite (nanoporous aluminosilicate) catalyst supports for recombining these molecules into jet fuel.

Previous studies had concluded that CO2, under the form of the bicarbonate anion (HCO3–) dominant (96% mole fraction) in the seawater inorganic carbon species could not be economically removed from seawater. However, by acidifying seawater by means of an adapted electrolysis cell with cation permeable membranes (dubbed a three-chambered electrochemical acidification cell), it is possible to economically convert HCO3– into CO2 at a pH lower than 6 and to increase the extraction yield. In January 2011, the NRL installed a prototype of seawater electrolysis cell at Naval Air Station Key West in Florida.

In 2017, Willauer et al. were granted a patent for a  extraction device from seawater, in the form of an electrolytic-cation exchange module (E-CEM). The E-CEM is seen as a "key step" in the production of synthetic fuel from seawater. Other researchers named in the patent are Felice DiMascio, Dennis R. Hardy, Jeffrey Baldwin, Matthew Bradley, James Morris, Ramagopal Ananth and Frederick W. Williams.

Feasibility of jet fuel synthesis
Willauer et al. Willauer et al. (2014) showed that the Fischer-Tropsch catalyst could be modified to synthesize various fuels such as methanol and natural gas, as well as the olefins that can be used as the building blocks for jet fuel.

Seawater was chosen because it contains 140 times more CO2 by volume than the atmosphere, and conventional water electrolysis also yields H2. The equipment for processing seawater is much smaller than that for processing air. Willauer considered that seawater was the "best option" for a source of synthetic jet fuel. By April 2014, the Willauer's team had not yet made fuel to the quality standard required for military jets, but they were able in September 2013 to use the fuel to fly a radio-controlled model airplane powered by a common two-stroke internal combustion engine.

Because the process requires a considerable input of electrical energy (~ 250 MW electricity mainly for the H2 production by water electrolysis and also to a lesser extent for the CO2 recovery from seawater), it cannot be performed on a large ship, even on a nuclear aircraft-carrier. The installations processing seawater to obtain H2 and CO2 (in fact CO),  the two essential ingredients necessary for the Fischer–Tropsch process, must be constructed on-shore, close to the sea, on islands in strategic remote locations (e.g., Hawai, Guam, Diego-Garcia) and powered by a nuclear reactor, or by ocean thermal energy conversion (OTEC).

Publications

Papers

Patents
  Filed: December 2, 2010. Granted: November 17, 2011.
  Filed: June 25, 2009. Granted: November 20, 2012.
  Filed: October 28, 2010. Granted: February 25, 2014.
  Filed August 10, 2012. Granted March 4, 2014.

References 

1974 births
Analytical chemists
Berry College alumni
Living people
University of Alabama alumni
Place of birth missing (living people)
Date of birth missing (living people)
People from Fairfax Station, Virginia
21st-century American inventors